Bilateral relations exist between Australia and Palau. Both countries are members of the Pacific Islands Forum (PIF).

High level visits 
In 2014, Australian deputy Prime Minister Warren Truss paid an official visit to Palau.

Military relations 
Australia and Palau have extensive military relations primarily in maritime security. Australia has provided a Pacific class patrol vessel to Palau to ensure maritime security and fight against illegal fishing. Lieutenant Commander Alan Willmore from the Royal Australian Navy is the Maritime Surveillance Advisor of Palau.

Development assistance 
Australia has been assisting Palau in the clearance of unexploded ordnance (UXO) from World War II and is the largest donor to Palau in this issue. Australia has also been helping Palau in the education and health sectors.

Trade 
As of 2013, Australian exports to Palau valued at $800,000 mainly consisting food products.

See also 
 Foreign relations of Australia
 Foreign relations of Palau

References 

Palau
Bilateral relations of Palau